Bertha Elias (Utrecht, 1 February 1889 – The Hague, 18 July 1933) was a Dutch lawyer, women's rights activist and museum director. As a director of the Museum for Education in The Hague, she was the first woman to hold such a position in the Netherlands in 1923. As successor to Herman van Cappelle, the first director of that museum, Elias achieved a considerable growth in the number of visitors, from approximately 2,500 in 1923 to 100,000 per year in 1932, of which three-quarters were schoolchildren.

References

1889 births
1933 deaths
Dutch women lawyers
20th-century Dutch lawyers
Dutch women's rights activists
Directors of museums in the Netherlands
Women museum directors
20th-century women lawyers
20th-century Dutch women